John Zachariah Kiernander (1711–1799), also known as Johann Zacharias Kiernander, was a Swedish Lutheran missionary in India.

He was the first Protestant Missionary to establish a base in Bengal. He built the Old Mission Church in Calcutta and founded one of the first printing presses in Calcutta. In 1781, he accused James Augustus Hicky, the editor and publisher of Hicky's Bengal Gazette of libel. He won the trial. He is the author of The Trial and Conviction of James Augustus Hicky.

Notes

External links
 

Swedish Protestant missionaries
Protestant missionaries in India
Swedish expatriates in India
1710 births
1799 deaths